In the Name of Love may refer to:

Music

Albums 
 In the Name of Love (Earth, Wind & Fire album) (1996)
 In the Name of Love (Peggy Lee album) (1964)
 In the Name of Love (Thompson Twins album) (1982)
 In the Name of Love (Yasmien Kurdi album) (2005)
 In the Name of Love: Artists United for Africa, a 2004 album by various artists

Songs 
 "In the Name of Love" (Martin Garrix and Bebe Rexha song), (2016)
 "In the Name of Love" (Monika Kuszyńska song) (2015)
 "In the Name of Love" (Thompson Twins song) (1982)
 "Pride (In the Name of Love)", a 1984 song by U2
 "Vo Ime Na Ljubovta" ("In the Name of Love"), a 2008 song by Tamara Todevska, Vrčak and Adrian Gaxha
 "In the Name of Love", a 2000 song by Eriko Imai
 "In the Name of Love", a 1991 song by Rick Astley from Free
 "In the Name of Love", a 2016 song by Delta Goodrem from Wings of the Wild

Film and television
 In the Name of Love (1925 film), an American film
 In the Name of Love: A Texas Tragedy, a 1995 Fox Network made-for-TV film
 In the Name of Love (2008 film), an Indonesian film
 In the Name of Love (2011 film), a Philippine film
 In the Name of Love (2012 film), a Vietnamese film
 In the Name of Love (TV series), a 2014 Chinese television series

See also
 In the Name of Love Tour, by Diana Ross
 "Stop! In the Name of Love", a 1965 song by the Supremes